Palaeomolis purpurascens is a moth of the subfamily Arctiinae first described by George Hampson in 1909. It is found in south-eastern Peru.

References

Moths described in 1909
Arctiini